Akizuki (秋月) is a Japanese surname. Notable people with the surname include:

, Japanese noble family
, Japanese manga artist
, Japanese diplomat
, Japanese samurai warrior
, Japanese samurai

Japanese-language surnames